The Thomas Bond Sprague Prize is a prize awarded annually to the student or students showing the greatest distinction in actuarial science,  finance, insurance, mathematics of operational research, probability, risk and statistics in the Master of Mathematics/Master of Advanced
Studies examinations of the University of Cambridge, also known as Part III of the Mathematical Tripos. The prize is named after Thomas Bond Sprague, the only person to have been president of both the Institute of Actuaries in London and the Faculty of Actuaries in Edinburgh. It is awarded by the Rollo Davidson Trust of Churchill College, Cambridge, following a donation by D. O. Forfar, MA, FFA, FRSE (alumnus of Trinity College, Cambridge), former Appointed Actuary of  Scottish Widows.

List of recipients

See also

 List of mathematics awards

References

Mathematical awards and prizes of the University of Cambridge
Awards established in 2012
Churchill College, Cambridge
2012 establishments in England
Student awards